The land of the Telugu people was referred to, during ancient times, as Āndhra dēśa (country of Andhra) and Trilingadēśa (country of Trilinga). The word Telugu is believed to have been derived from trilinga, as in Trilinga Deśa, "the country of the three lingas". According to a Hindu chronicle, Shiva descended as linga on three mountains which marked the boundaries of the Telugu country, namely Kaleswaram in Telangana, Srisailam in Rayalaseema and Bhimeswaram, also known as Draksharamam, in Coastal Andhra. It was also believed that the word Telangana derived from Telingana, Telinga, Trilinga.

In Andhra Kaumudi, a Telugu grammar book, it was mentioned that Andhra Vishnu, having built an immense wall connecting the three mountains with the Mahendra hills, formed in it three gates, in which the three-eyed Ishwara, bearing the trident in his hand and attended by a host of divinities, resided in the form of three lingams. Āndhra Viṣṇu assisted by divine angels having fought with the great giant Nishambhu for thirteen yugas killed him in battle and took up his residence with the sages on the banks of the river Godavari, since which time the Telugu country has been named Trilingam.

Temples

References

Hindu pilgrimage sites in India
Shiva temples in Andhra Pradesh
Hindu holy cities
Hindu temples in Telangana
Shiva temples in India